Henry Ponder (born 1928 in Wewoka, Oklahoma) is a U.S. educator.

Ponder received his undergraduate, masters, and doctorate degree from Langston University, Oklahoma State University, Ohio State University.  He went on to serve as the president of Talladega College, Benedict College, and Fisk University.

Ponder was the 28th General President of Alpha Phi Alpha fraternity, the first Greek-letter collegiate organization established for African Americans.  He is the vice-chairman the fraternity's World Policy Council, a think tank whose purpose is to expand Alpha Phi Alpha's involvement in politics, and social and current policy to encompass international concerns.

Sources

1928 births
Fisk University faculty
Talladega College
Alpha Phi Alpha presidents
Langston University alumni
Oklahoma State University alumni
Ohio State University alumni
Living people